Pedro Boscardin Dias (born 28 January 2003) is a Brazilian tennis player.

Boscardin Dias has a career high ATP singles ranking of 293 achieved on 22 August 2022. He also has a career high doubles ranking of 421 achieved on 1 August 2022.

Boscardin Dias has won 1 ATP Challenger doubles title at the 2023 Challenger de Santiago with João Lucas Reis da Silva.

Tour finals

Singles

Doubles

References

External links
 
 

2003 births
Living people
Brazilian male tennis players
People from Joinville